Abnash House is a grade II listed seven-bedroom house in Chalford, Gloucestershire, near Stroud, with seven acres of grounds.

In September 2020, it was put for sale at £2.5 million by its then owner, the pop singer Alfie Boe. It sold in December 2020 for £2.22 million.

References

Country houses in Gloucestershire
Grade II listed houses in Gloucestershire